Pablo Bastianini (born 9 November 1982 in Zárate, Buenos Aires) is an Argentine footballer who plays for the Coras de Tepic in the Ascenso MX. Besides Argentina, he has played in England, Greece, Venezuela, Israel, Japan, and Mexico.

Club career 
He started his footballing career in the youth divisions of Argentinos Juniors and Club Atlético Independiente.

His professional debut was with Defensores de Belgrano in 2002 against Club Almagro in the Primera B Nacional, a game which finished 1-1. in 2003 he joined Quilmes where he played in the Copa Sudamericana 2004 and Copa Libertadores 2005. In 2005, he moved to England to join Football League One team Yeovil Town on a two-year contract. In 2006 he moved to the Greek Super League with Ionikos FC of Athens.

In 2008, he returned to South America, more precisely to the Venezuelan team Caracas FC who recruited for the Copa Libertadores 2008 group stage where they played in a group with Cruzeiro, San Lorenzo and Real Potosí.

At the end of the season Caracas FC played the final against Deportivo Táchira, defining the overall champion of Venezuela between the champions of the Apertura and Clausura, which they won.

In June 2008 he signed a 1-year contract with Maccabi Petah Tikva team from the Israeli Premier League and in May 2009 he was released from his contract.

In January 2010, he was transferred to Yokohama F. Marinos of J1 League, Japan.

References

External links 
 

  Argentine Primera statistics

1982 births
Living people
People from Zárate, Buenos Aires
Sportspeople from Buenos Aires Province
Argentine people of Italian descent
Argentine footballers
Argentine expatriate footballers
Association football forwards
Defensores de Belgrano footballers
Primera Nacional players
Quilmes Atlético Club footballers
Yeovil Town F.C. players
Ionikos F.C. players
Caracas FC players
Maccabi Petah Tikva F.C. players
English Football League players
J1 League players
Yokohama F. Marinos players
Chacarita Juniors footballers
Club Atlético Patronato footballers
Boca Unidos footballers
Central Córdoba de Rosario footballers
Argentine expatriate sportspeople in Japan
Expatriate footballers in Japan
Argentine expatriate sportspeople in England
Expatriate footballers in England
Argentine expatriate sportspeople in Israel
Expatriate footballers in Israel
Argentine expatriate sportspeople in Venezuela
Expatriate footballers in Venezuela
Argentine expatriate sportspeople in Greece